Alexandru Badea (8 March 1938 – 17 July 1986) was a Romanian footballer.

International career
Alexandru Badea played four matches at international level for Romania, scoring two goals. He made his debut against Eusébio's Portugal in a 1966 FIFA World Cup qualification match, scoring Romania's final goal in a 2–0 home victory.

Honours
Petrolul Ploiești
Divizia A: 1965–66
Cupa României: 1962–63

References

External links

Alexandru Badea at Labtof.ro

1938 births
1986 deaths
Romanian footballers
Romania international footballers
Association football forwards
Liga I players
Liga II players
CSM Flacăra Moreni players
FC Petrolul Ploiești players
FCV Farul Constanța players
FC Gloria Buzău players
People from Dâmbovița County